The 9th Aintree 200 was a Formula One motor race held on 18 April 1964 at Aintree Circuit, Merseyside. The race was run over 67 laps of the circuit, and was won by Australian driver Jack Brabham in a Brabham BT7-Climax. BRM driver Graham Hill started from pole position and finished second, and Lotus driver Peter Arundell was third. Arundell's team mate Jim Clark set fastest lap.

During most of the race, Brabham duelled for the lead with Clark, but the Australian won easily after Clark was obstructed by André Pilette and crashed on lap 47.

There was also a class for Formula Two cars in this race, which was won by Lotus driver Mike Spence after the two cars in front of him retired on the last lap; Brian Hart suffering a driveshaft failure and Alan Rees running out of fuel.

This was the last occasion on which the BARC 200 was held at Aintree, and the last occasion on which it was run as a Formula One race.

Results
''Note: a blue background indicates a Formula Two entrant.

References
 "The Grand Prix Who's Who", Steve Small, 1995.
 "The Formula One Record Book", John Thompson, 1974.
 Results at silhouet.com 

Aintree 200
Aintree 200
Aintree 200